The 1986–87 season was Mansfield Town's 50th season in the Football League and 16th in the Third Division they finished in 10th position with 61 points. They also won the Football League Trophy after beating Bristol City in the final.

Final league table

Results

Football League Third Division

FA Cup

League Cup

League Trophy

Squad statistics
 Squad list sourced from

References
General
 Mansfield Town 1986–87 at soccerbase.com (use drop down list to select relevant season)

Specific

Mansfield Town F.C. seasons
Mansfield Town